Captain general, the top Army officer rank, is used by various countries:
Australia
Captain general is used when describing the ceremonial head of the Royal Australian Artillery.
Bolivia
The head of state for the duration of his tenure has the rank of captain general as head of the Armed forces, despite being a civilian.
Canada
Captain general is used generally when describing the ceremonial head of a corps or military unit.
Chile
If the commander in chief of the Army and the head of state are reunited in the same person, they are promoted to the permanent military rank of capitan general. It has only happened three times in Chile's history. Current electoral provisions forbid the commander in chief becoming president.
France
The title of captain general (capitaine général) has been only sporadically used. 
Germany
In Bavaria, the captain general (generalkapitän) was the leader of the Hartschier Guard. 
In Prussia, a captain general (generalkapitän) was the commander of the Gastle Guard and Life Guards.
Italy
In the Papal States, the title of captain general of the Church was given to the de facto commander-in-chief of the Papal Army.
In the Republic of Venice, captain general, was the commander in chief of the fleet in war times.
Netherlands
Maurice of Nassau received the title of "Captain General of the Union" and "Admiral General" in 1587, which became hereditary until taken away by the States General in 1786.
New Zealand
Captain general is used when describing the ceremonial head of the Royal New Zealand Artillery and the Royal New Zealand Armoured Corps.
Portugal
Captain general, this title was given, in 1508, to the commander-in-chief of the Ordenanças (the territorial army of the crown).
During the Portuguese Restoration War, after 1640, the "captain-general of the Arms of the Kingdom", became the commander-in-chief of the Portuguese Army. In 1762 the post of the captain-general was replaced.
Captain-general of the Royal Navy was the commander-in-chief of the Portuguese Navy in the 17th and 18th centuries.
Spain
Captain general (Spanish Army)
Captain general of the Spanish Navy
Air captain general (Spanish Air Force)
Captain general of Catalonia
Captain general of Galicia
Captain generals of the Spanish Empire
United Kingdom
Captain general was first attested in the 1520s as the title for the permanent Commander in Chief of the Armies of the Kingdom of England. The title was commonly used in the 17th century and the office was held until 1745 (Kingdom of Great Britain).
Captain general remains in Scottish use of the head of Royal Company of Archers.
The British monarch is captain general of the Honourable Artillery Company and also of the Royal Regiment of Artillery. The captain general of the Royal Marines is the ceremonial head of this corps.
In New South Wales, from 1787 to 1837, captain general was the term  of to refer to the governor.
United States
In Connecticut, the state Constitution of 1965 states that the governor is also the captain general of the state militia.
In Rhode Island, the Governor holds two different military titles. According to Article IX, section 3 of the Rhode Island Constitution, the Governor holds the titles of captain-general and commander-in-chief. 
In Vermont, the 1786 Constitution of Vermont, which became effective when Vermont was an independent country and continued in effect for two years after Vermont's admission to the Union in 1791, says "The governor shall be captain general and commander-in-chief of the forces of the State, but shall not command in person, except advised thereto by the Council, and then only as long as they shall approve thereof."
Czech Republic, Poland, Lithuania and Ukraine
The term captain general, as Hetman, is a political title from Eastern Europe, historically assigned to military commanders. It was the title of the second-highest military commander in 15th to 18th and 20th centuries.

In fiction
In J. R. R. Tolkien's The Lord of the Rings, Boromir is considered to be a captain general of Gondor.
In Robert Jordan's Wheel of Time, captain general is the highest rank of the Ever Victorious Army of Seanchan. Captain general is also the title of both the leader of the Queen's Guard of Andor and the head of the Green Ajah of the Aes Sedai.
In the BattleTech, captain-general is the title of the military and political leader of the Free Worlds League. 
In Assassin's Creed: Brotherhood, Cesare Borgia is depicted in the office of captain general of the Papal Army.
In Eric Flint's Ring of Fire, Gustav II Adolf of Sweden, is granted the newly created hereditary title of captain general of the State of Thuringia.
In the Warhammer 40,000, the title captain general is given to the head of the Adeptus Custodes. In the aftermath, the captain general was granted a position as a High Lord of Terra and ultimate authority over who could approach the Golden Throne.